Gerardo Hernán Matos Rodríguez (March 28, 1897 – April 25, 1948), also known as Becho, was a Uruguayan musician, composer and journalist.

Background and early career
Gerardo Hernán Matos Rodríguez was born in Montevideo, the son of the owner of the Moulin Rouge, a popular local cabaret. He studied architecture, but did not complete the course. He began composing as a young student in 1917, and his first known work was "La Cumparsita", which he wrote on the piano of the Federación de Estudiantes of Uruguay  . It became one of the most recognizable tango pieces, though Matos was initially too shy to play the piece himself and it became well known through the performance of others.

He travelled widely throughout Europe and stayed in Paris for a time, as well as working as Uruguayan consul to Germany. In 1931, he collaborated on the film score for Luces de Buenos Aires, shot in Joinville-le-Pont, France, and starring renowned tango vocalist Carlos Gardel.

Principal compositions

The most famous classic tango of all times is "La Cumparsita", written by Matos Rodríguez in 1916, with lyrics added later by Pascual Contursi and Enrique Pedro Maroni. Roberto Firpo, director and pianist of the orchestra that premiered the song, added parts of his tangos "La Gaucha Manuela" and "Curda Completa" to Matos' carnival march, resulting in "La Cumparsita".

Matos Rodríguez also composed pieces for theater plays premiered in Buenos Aires, among them Manuel Romero's El Gran Circo Rivolta. He led his own tango orchestra in Montevideo for a short time afterwards.

Other tangos composed by him include: “Che papusa, oí”, “Son grupos”, “Yo tuve una novia”, “Cuando bronca el temporal”, “Hablame”, “Pobre corazón”, “Haceme caso a mí”, “Canto por no llorar”, “Rosa reseca”, “Botija linda”, “El pescador”, “Te fuiste, ¡ja, ja!”, “Adiós Argentina”, “Mi provinciana”, “La milonga azul”, “Dale celos”, “Raspail”, “Mocosita”, “La muchacha del circo”, and “San Telmo”. Rodríguez collaborated with the lyricists Enrique Cadícamo, Victor Soliño, Juan B. A. Reyes, Manuel Romero and Fernán Silva Valdés. With the latter he wrote a series of Canciones Montevideanas ("Songs of Montevideo"), including "Margarita Punzó".

He died in Montevideo after a long illness in 1948.

See also
 Music of Uruguay

References

Todo Tango: Gerardo Matos Rodríguez

External links

20th-century composers
20th-century pianists
1897 births
1948 deaths
Burials at the Central Cemetery of Montevideo
People from Montevideo
Uruguayan composers
Male composers
Uruguayan expatriates in France
Uruguayan expatriates in Germany
Uruguayan people of Spanish descent
Uruguayan pianists
Male pianists
Uruguayan male musicians
Uruguayan tango musicians
20th-century male musicians